Another Sleepless Night may refer to:

 "Another Sleepless Night" (Anne Murray song), 1982 
 "Another Sleepless Night" (Shawn Christopher song), 1990
 Another Sleepless Night, a 2001 live album by Northern Lights
 "Another Sleepless Night", a song by Before the Mourning from the album Etherial End